Dream Dancing is an album led by trombonist Jimmy Knepper which was recorded in 1986 and released on the Criss Cross Jazz label.

Reception 

The Allmusic review by Scott Yanow states "The music is essentially straight-ahead hard bop, but Knepper's continually surprising solos uplift the music".

Track listing 
All compositions by Jimmy Knepper except where noted.
 "Dream Dancing" (Cole Porter) – 7:04
 "Goodbye" (Gordon Jenkins) – 6:25
 "All Through the Night" (Porter) – 5:22
 "In the Interim" – 6:43
 "Of Things Past" – 6:34 	
 "This Time the Dream's on Me" (Harold Arlen, Johnny Mercer) – 7:16 	
 "In the Interim" [take 3] – 5:58 Bonus track on CD 	
 "Dream Dancing" [take 1] (Porter) – 7:14 Bonus track on CD
 "Night Vision" – 6:57 Bonus track on CD

Personnel 
Jimmy Knepper – trombone
Ralph Moore – tenor saxophone
Dick Katz – piano
George Mraz – bass
Mel Lewis – drums

References 

Jimmy Knepper albums
1986 albums
Criss Cross Jazz albums
Albums recorded at Van Gelder Studio